Centrocerum richteri is a species of beetle in the family Cerambycidae. It was described by Bruch in 1911.

References

Elaphidiini
Beetles described in 1911